Jean-Claude Mathis (born August 15, 1939 in Bouzonville, Moselle) was a member of the National Assembly of France.  He represented the 2nd constituency of Aube from 2002 to 2017, as a member of the Union for a Popular Movement.

References

1939 births
Living people
People from Moselle (department)
Rally for the Republic politicians
Union for a Popular Movement politicians
Deputies of the 12th National Assembly of the French Fifth Republic
Deputies of the 13th National Assembly of the French Fifth Republic
Deputies of the 14th National Assembly of the French Fifth Republic